Pedro Jaime Esteve (latinicized: Estevius, Catalan: Pere Jaume Esteve; c. 1500 in Sant Mateu del Maestrat – 1556 in Valencia) was a Spanish doctor, botanist, and humanist.

Life and work 
Pedro Jaime Esteve studied in Valencia, Paris, and Montpellier. Later, he worked as a professor of medicine and mathematics at the University of Valencia. In 1551, he published the Hippocratic work "Epidemics II" in Greek, with numerous illustrations and a Latin translation. This book was the medical foundation of humanism in  Spain. In 1552, he published a critical edition of "Theriaca", a work on the poisons and bites of snakes and scorpions, by the ancient Greek doctor Nicander of Colophon. He made his Latin hexameter version available with Latin and Catalan nomenclature and taxonomy of some plants from the region of Valencia. Later, Esteve wrote a volume on medicinal herbs, which, however, has been lost.

Notes
The American plant genus Stevia is named after Pedro Jaime Esteve.

References
 Enciclopèdia Catalana: Esteve, Pere Jaume. In: Gran enciclopèdia catalana. 2. Edition 5. Reprint 1992. Volume 10. Enciclopèdia catalana, Barcelona 1987, S. 322 (Catalan).(Note: In the  Enciclopèdia Catalana article, the Spanish first name of "Pedro Jaime" Esteve has been Catalanicized to "Pere Jaume")

Bibliography
  Helmut Genaust: Etymologisches Wörterbuch der botanischen Pflanzennamen. 3., complete edited and extended edition. Nikol, Hamburg 2005, S. 611 (Entry „Stevia“) (Reprint of 1996).

External links
 Enciclopèdia.cat: Pere Jaume Esteve. Accessed April 14, 2018 (Catalan). (Note: In the Enciclopèdia Catalana article, the Spanish first name of "Pedro Jaime" Esteve has been Catalanicized to "Pere Jaume")

Spanish Renaissance humanists
16th-century Spanish botanists
1500 births
1556 deaths
Year of birth uncertain